Rogel is a surname. Notable people with the surname include:

 Agustín Rogel (born 1997), Uruguayan footballer
 Anna Rogel (1751–1784), Finnish preacher
 Bernard Rogel (born 1956), French admiral
 Fran Rogel (1927–2002), American football player
 Jason Rogel (born 1976), American actor
 José Rogel (1829–1901), Spanish composer
 Luis Rogel (born 1985), Chilean footballer
 Nakdimon Rogel (1925–2011), Israeli journalist
 Steven Rogel, American business executive

See also
 
 Rogelj